BattlEye is a proprietary anti-cheat software system which protects games and their players from hacking, cheating, and other forms of exploits while playing an online game. It was initially released as a third-party anti-cheat for Battlefield Vietnam in 2004 and has since been officially implemented in numerous video games including PUBG: Battlegrounds, ARMA 3, and DayZ.

BattlEye supports Valve Corporation's Proton compatibility layer and is usable on the Steam Deck.

Anti-Cheat Processes 

Part of the prevention process is Ring0 kernel agent[ref] which uses a combination of DLL Whitelist and/or OB_callback routines as a way to prevent the game process from external hooks. To detect the external program that tries to inject some of its codes or files to cheat, all of the anti-cheat programs have to detect a specific pattern that the cheat might use. For example, strings (cheat names or scripts), program certificates, memory patterns, register entries, or simple file scanning.

How the architecture is built for the client interaction with the server can also improve the protection. There are certain outcomes that are known in the game and can be checked, for example, a bullet should not change the direction while traveling, but because the server is what manages all of the checking, performance, and impact done on the game and the server should be considered. Keeping a log of any activities between the client and the server can be used as a strategy to help identify and ban the hacker or make the game more complex in the hacking process for instant, unpacking, extracting, identifying or misleading and creating trap by creating fake checks, fake detections, using ban waves or delay bans.

Games using BattlEye 

 Tibia (1997)
 ARMA 2 (2009)
 PlanetSide 2 (2012)
 ARMA 3 (2013)
 Rainbow Six Siege (2015)
 Heroes & Generals (2016)
 Escape from Tarkov (2017)
 Ark: Survival Evolved (2017)
 Unturned (2017)
 Destiny 2 (2017)
 PUBG: Battlegrounds (2017)
 Fortnite Battle Royale (2017)
 Z1 Battle Royale (2018)
 DayZ (2018)
 PlanetSide Arena (2019)
 Watch Dogs: Legion (2020)
 Arma Reforger (2022)
 The Cycle: Frontier (2022)
 Mount & Blade II: Bannerlord'' (2022)

References

External links 

 Official Website

Anti-cheat software
2004 software
Proprietary software